Ice cream is a sweetened frozen dessert made from milk or sugar.

Ice Cream may also refer to:

Film
 Ice Cream (1986 film), a Malayalam-language film
 Ice Cream (1993 film), an American surrealist comedy short film
 Ice Cream (2014 film), a Telugu-language film directed by Ram Gopal Varma
 Ice Cream (2015 film), an Indian Tulu film
 Ice Cream (2016 film), a Bangladeshi coming-of-age romantic drama film

Songs
 "Ice Cream" (Battles song), 2011
 "Ice Cream" (Blackpink and Selena Gomez song), 2020
 "Ice Cream" (Hyuna song), 2012
 "Ice Cream" (Raekwon song), 1995
 "Ice Cream" ("I Scream, You Scream, We All Scream for Ice Cream"), a 1927 novelty song
 "Ice Cream", by f(x), from the 2010 EP Nu ABO
 "Ice Cream", by Lil Wayne from the 2009 album No Ceilings
 "Ice Cream", by Muscles, 2008
 "Ice Cream", by NYPC, 2006
 "Ice Cream", by Sarah McLachlan, from the 1993 album Fumbling Towards Ecstasy
 "Ice Cream", by Twice from the 2017 album Twicecoaster: Lane 2
 "Ice Cream", by Mika from the 2019 album My Name Is Michael Holbrook
 "Ice Cream", by Teenage Joans from the 2021 EP Taste of Me

Other uses
 Ice Cream (mango), named mango cultivar originating in Trinidad and Tobago
 Chery QQ Ice Cream, a 2022– Chinese electric city car
 Ice Cream, a clothing brand from Billionaire Boys Club
 Ice Cream, nickname of Nigerian footballer Osa Guobadia (b. 1987)

See also
 I scream (disambiguation)